Cherchell (Arabic: شرشال) is a town on Algeria's Mediterranean coast,  west of Algiers. It is the seat of Cherchell District in Tipaza Province. Under the names Iol and Caesarea, it was formerly a Roman colony and the capital of the kingdoms of Numidia and Mauretania.

Names

The town was originally known by the Phoenician and Punic name , meaning "island of sand". The Punic name was hellenized as Iṑl and Latinized as Iol.

After its notional refounding as a Roman colony, it was formally named   after its imperial patron Claudius.

History

Antiquity

Phoenicians established their first major wave of colonies on the coasts between their homeland and the Strait of Gibraltar in the 8th centuryBC, but Iol was probably established around 600BC and the oldest remains so far discovered at Cherchell date from the 5th centuryBC. By that time, Carthage had already taken control of the Phoenicians in the western Mediterranean. Punic Iol was one of the more important trading posts in what is now Algeria. In the 3rd centuryBC, it was fortified and began issuing Numidia's first coins in bronze and silver, bearing Punic text, Carthaginian gods, and images of local produce, particularly fish.

After the Punic Wars, Carthage's holdings in northwest Africa were mostly given to Rome's local allies. Iol was given to Micipsa, the king of Numidia, who first established it as a royal court. The town minted its own coins and received new defensive works in the 1st centuryBC. Its Punic culture continued, but worship of Baal Hammon was notionally substituted with worship of his Roman equivalent Saturn.

Iol was annexed directly to Rome in 33BC. Augustus established  as king of Mauretania in 25BC, giving him the city as his capital, which Juba then renamed in his honor. Juba and his wife Cleopatra (the daughter of Mark Antony and Cleopatra of Egypt) rebuilt the city on a lavish scale, combining Roman and Hellenized Egyptian styles. The roads were relaid on a grid and amenities included a theater, an art gallery, and a lighthouse modeled after the Pharos in Alexandria. The royal couple were buried in the Royal Mausoleum of Mauretania. The seaport capital and its kingdom flourished during this period, with most of the population being of Greek and Phoenician origin with a minority of Berbers.

Their son Ptolemy was assassinated by Caligula during a trip to Rome in AD40. Rome proclaimed the annexation of Mauretania, which was resisted by Ptolemy's former slave Aedemon and by Berber leaders such as Sabalus. Caligula himself was murdered before Rome's response could be made, but his successor Claudius sent legions under Gn. Hosidius Geta and G. Suetonius Paulinus to complete the conquest. By 44, most resistance had been ended and the former kingdom was divided into two Roman provinces, one governed from Tingis (present-day Tangiers) and another governed from Caesarea. Mauretania Caesariensis extended along what is now the Algerian coast and included most of the hinterland as far as the Atlas Mountains.

Roman colonies of veteran soldiers were established in the new provinces to maintain order. Caesarea itself was made a colony, with its residents gaining Roman citizenship. It prospered as a provincial capital during the 1st and 2nd centuries, reaching a population of over 20,000 and possibly as many as 30,000. It was defended by auxiliary units and was the harbor of Rome's Mauretanian Fleet, which was established as a permanent force after Berber raids in the early 170s. The city featured a hippodrome, amphitheater, numerous temples, and civic buildings like a basilica. It was surrounded by suburban villas whose agricultural mosaics are now celebrated. It had its own school of philosophy, academy, and library. It received a new forum and further patronage from the African emperor Septimius Severus and his dynasty, possibly reaching as many as 100,000 inhabitants. Its native son Macrinus and his son Diadumenian became the first Berber and lower-class emperors, reigning in 217 and 218. (Their predecessor's wastefulness and wars required unpopular financial adjustments that led to their overthrow in favor of Elagabalus.) Juba's theater was converted into an amphitheater sometime after the year 300.

The city was sacked by a Berber revolt in 371 and 372. It largely recovered, but was ravaged again by the Vandals after they were invited into Roman North Africa by Count Boniface in 429. Parts of the town received new fortifications. After the Vandal Kingdom conquered Carthage in 439, they also acquired a large part of Rome's Mediterranean fleet which they used to carry out raids all over the sea. Caesarea's port was sometimes used as a base for these raiders, and the city prospered from their plunder. Its schools produced the famous grammarian Priscian, who emigrated to the Byzantine east.

Middle Ages

In 533, the Vandal Kingdom was conquered by Byzantine forces under Justinian's general Belisarius. Caesarea was among the areas to return to imperial rule. It was the seat of Mauretania's duke, but it went into decline and its city center was given over to ramshackle housing for the poor. The first duke was named John; that he was given an infantry unit rather than cavalry implies that he was meant to hold the port without much concern about controlling its surrounding hinterland.

The town remained under Byzantine control until its Muslim conquest in the late 7th century. Successive waves of Umayyad attacks into Byzantine North African territory over 15 years wore down the smaller and less motivated imperial forces, until finally Umayyad troops laid siege to the city of Caesarea and, although the defenders were resupplied by Byzantine fleets, finally overwhelmed it. Much of the Byzantine nobility and officials fled to other parts of the Empire, while most of the remaining Roman and semi-Roman Berber population accepted Islamic rule which granted them protected status.

Some remained Christians. For two generations what remained of the Roman population and Romanized Berbers launched several revolts often in conjunction with reinforcements from the Empire. As a result, by the ninth century down much of the city's defences were damaged beyond repair, and resulting in its political loss of importance, leaving the former city little more than a small village.

For the following few centuries, the city remained a power center of Arabs and Berbers with a small but significant population of Christians who were fully assimilated by the beginning of the Early Modern period. Similarly, by the 10th century the city's name had transformed in the local dialect from a Latin to a Berber and ultimately into the Arabised form Sharshal (in French orthography, Cherchell).

The Norman Kingdom of Africa raided Berreshk, near Cherchell, in 1144.

Modernity 

Eventually, Ottoman Turks managed to successfully reconquer the city from Spanish occupation in the 16th century, using the city primarily as a fortified port. In 1520, Hayreddin Barbarossa captured the town and annexed the Algerian Pashalic. His elder brother Oruç Reis built a fort over the town. Under Turkish occupation, the city's importance as a port and fort led to it being inhabited by Moslems of many nationalities, some engaging in privateering and piracy on the Mediterranean.

In reply, European navies and especially the French Navy and the Knights Hospitaller (self-proclaimed descendants of the Crusaders) laid siege to the city and occasionally captured it for limited periods of time. For a century in the 1600s and for a brief period in the 1700s the city either was under Spanish or Hospitallar control. During this period a number of palaces were built, but the overwhelming edifice of Hayreddin Barbarossa's citadel, was considered too militarily valuable to destroy and uncover the previous ancient buildings of old Caesarea.

After the end of the Napoleonic Wars and Revolutions of the early 19th century, the French under both British, American, and other European powers were encouraged to attack and destroy the Barbary Pirates. From 1836 to 1840 various allied navies, but mostly French hunted down the Barbary pirates and conquered the Barbary ports while threatening the Ottoman Empire with war if it intervened. In 1840, the French after a significant siege captured and occupied the town. The French lynched the Barbary Pirates including the local pasha for Crimes against the laws of nations.{fact}

In turn, many ancient statues and buildings were either restored and left in Cherchell, or taken to museums in Algiers, Algeria or Paris, France for further study. However, not all building projects were successful in uncovering and restoring the ancient town. The Roman amphitheatre was considered mostly unsalvageable and unnecessary to rebuilt. Its dress stones were used to the build a new French fort and barracks. Materials from the Hippodrome were used to build a new church. The steps of the Hippodrome were partly destroyed by Cardinal Charles Lavigerie in a search for the tomb of Saint Marciana.

French occupation also brought new European settlement, to join the city's long-established communities of semi-Arabized Christians of local origin and old European merchant families, in addition to Berbers and Arab Muslims. Under French rule, European and Christians became a majority of the population again until World War II.

In the immediate years before World War II, losses to the French national population from World War I, and a declining birthrate in general among Europeans kept further colonial settlement to a trickle. Arab and Berber populations started seeing an increase in growth. French-Algerian colonial officials and landowners encouraged larger numbers of surrounding Berber tribesmen to move into the surrounding region to work the farms and groves cheaply. In turn, more and more Berbers and Arabs moved into the city seeking employment. By 1930 the combined Berbo-Arab Algerian population represented nearly 40% of the city's population.

The changing demographics within the city were disguised by the large numbers of French military personnel based there and the numbers of European tourists visiting what had become known as the Algerian Riviera. Additionally, during World War II, Cherchell, with its libraries, cafes, restaurants, and hotels served as a base for the United States Army and Allied War effort, hosting a summit conference between the US and UK in October 1942.

The end of the war with its departure of Allied forces and a reduction of French naval personnel due to rebasing saw an actual decline in Europeans living in the city. Additionally, the general austerity of the post-war years dried up the tourism industry and caused financial stagnation and losses to the local Franco-Algerian community. In 1952, a census recorded that the Frenco-Algerian population had declined to 50% of the population.

For the remaining 1950's Cherchell was only slightly caught up by the Algerian War of Independence. With its large proportion of Europeans, French control and influence was strong enough to discourage all but the most daring attacks by anti-French insurgents. By 1966, after independence from the French, Cherchell had lost nearly half of its population and all of its Franco-Algerian population.

Independent Algeria
Cherchell has continued to grow post-independence, recovering to peak colonial-era population by the 1980s. Cherchell currently has industries in marble, plaster quarries and iron mines. The town trades in oils, tobacco and earthenware. Additionally, the ancient cistern first developed by Juba and Cleopatra Selene II was restored and expanded under recent French rule and still supplies water to the town.

Although the Algerian Riviera ended with the war, Cherchell is still a popular tourist places in Algeria. Cherchell has various splendid temples and monuments from the Punic, Numidian and Roman periods, and the works of art found there, including statues of Neptune and Venus, are now in the Museum of Antiquities in Algiers. The former Roman port is no longer in commercial use and has been partly filled by alluvial deposits and has been affected by earthquakes. The former local mosque of the Hundred Columns contains 89 columns of diorite. This remarkable building now serves as a hospital. The local museum displays some of the finest ancient Greek and Roman antiquities found in Africa. Cherchell is the birthplace of writer and movie director Assia Djebar.

Historical population

Remains 
Earthquakes, wars and plunder have ravaged many of the ancient remains.

Some remains can be seen in the local Archeological Museum of Chercell-Caesarea.

Religion
Christianity arrived in Caesarea early enough to produce martyrs during the Diocletianic Persecution. For vandalizing an idol of Diana, StMarciana was supposedly tortured and killed in Caesarea's arena, gored by a bull and mauled by a leopard for the amusement of the crowd. StTheodota and her sons were also supposedly martyred in the city.

Caesarea was a bishopric from about 314 to 484, although not all of its bishops are known. Fortunatus took part in the 314 Council of Arles, which condemned Donatism. Clemens was mentioned in one of Symmachus's letters and would have served in the 370s. During the 411 synod at Carthage, Caesarea was represented by the Donatist Emeritus and the orthodox Deuterius. StAugustine accosted Emeritus at Caesarea in the autumn of 418 and secured his exile. Apocorius was an orthodox bishop whom Huneric summoned to Carthage in 484 and then exiled. An early 8th-century Notitia Episcopatuum still included this see.

Caesarea was revived by the Roman Catholic Church as a titular see in the 19th century. It was distinguished as "Caesarea in Mauretania" in 1933. Its bishops have included:

 Titular Bishop Biagio Pisani (1897.04.23 – 1901.06.07)
 Titular Bishop Pietro Maffi (1902.06.09 – 1903.06.22)
 Titular Bishop Thomas Francis Brennan (1905.10.07 – 1916.03.20)
 Titular Archbishop Pierre-Célestin Cézerac (1918.01.02 – 1918.03.18)
 Titular Archbishop Cardinal Wilhelmus Marinus van Rossum, CSSR (1918.04.25 – 1918.05.20)
 Titular Archbishop Benedetto Aloisi Masella (1919.12.15 – 1946.02.18)
 Titular Bishop Luigi Cammarata (1946.12.04 – 1950.02.25)
 Titular Bishop Francesco Pennisi (1950.07.11 – 1955.10.01)
 Titular Bishop André-Jacques Fougerat (1956.07.16 – 1957.01.05)
 Titular Bishop Carmelo Canzonieri (1957.03.11 – 1963.07.30)
 Titular Bishop Archbishop Enea Selis (1964.01.18 – 1971.09.02)
 Titular Bishop Giuseppe Moizo (1972.01.22 – 1976.07.01)
 Titular Archbishop Sergio Sebastiani (1976.09.27 – 2001.02.21)
 Titular Bishop Gerard Johannes Nicolaas de Korte (2001.04.11 – 2008.06.18)
 Titular Bishop Stanislaus Tobias Magombo (2009.04.29 – 2010.07.06)
 Titular Archbishop Walter Brandmüller (2010.11.04 – 2010.11.20)
 Titular Archbishop Marek Solczyński (2011.11.26 – present)

Gallery

See also 
 List of lighthouses in Algeria

References

Citations

Bibliography
 
 
 .
 .
 .
 . 
 .
 .
 .
 .
 .
 .
 .
 .

External links 

 GigaCatholic with titular incumbent biography links
Various ancient ruins of Cherchell:
A Roman ruin
An ancient theater 
A Roman aqueduct near Cherchell

Communes of Tipaza Province
Archaeological sites in Algeria
Catholic titular sees in Africa
Former Roman Catholic dioceses in Africa
Roman towns and cities in Mauretania Caesariensis
Ancient Berber cities
Phoenician colonies in Algeria
Populated places established in the 4th century BC
4th-century BC establishments
Lighthouses in Algeria
Tipaza Province